The Cebu International Convention Center (CICC) is a 3-story structure built by the Cebu Provincial Government for the 12th Asean Summit and 2nd East Asia Summit at a cost of about US$ ten million. It has a gross floor area of 28,000 square metres and is situated on 3.8 hectares of land at the Mandaue City Reclamation Area in Metro Cebu, Philippines.

Development
The site where the convention centre now stands was originally intended for a sports complex dubbed as the "Cebu Mega Dome". A contest was held for its design and the winning entry was the "spinning disc" by Architect Alexus Medalla. The project however was stalled after some members of the provincial board opposed it.

In late 2005, Philippine President Gloria Macapagal Arroyo decided that the province would host the 12th ASEAN Summit and 2nd East Asia Summit in December 2006, which was later moved to January 12–15, 2007, due to Typhoon Utor. The Philippines was supposed to host the twin summits in December 2007 but Myanmar, the original host for 2006, backed out. Since the province lacked a stand-alone convention centre with complete facilities for a large and prestigious international gathering like the ASEAN Summit, Cebu Governor Gwendolyn García revived the "mega dome" project but with the design revised as a convention centre instead of a sports arena. The external structure would still be that of a "spinning disc".

A few weeks afterwards a new design was put forwards and was considered, since it was cheaper and easier to build (granting that it was smaller in size too) and that there was a time constraint that the Cebu Provincial Government had to stick to. Construction for the substructure began in April 2006 and work on the superstructure itself, which was largely made up of structural steel, glass and aluminum cladding, began three months after. The centre was finished four months later in late November and was officially inaugurated on January 6, 2007.

It has been closed since the October 2013 Bohol earthquake, having suffered major damage, and has since fallen into disrepair. The convention center was damaged further by the wrath of both Typhoon Yolanda (Haiyan) in 2013, a month after the Bohol earthquake, and then by Typhoon Odette (Rai) in 2021.

Acquisition of the Mandaue City Government
The facility is owned by the Provincial Government of Cebu. In October 2016, it was announced that the City Government of Mandaue will be acquiring the CICC. The city government will pay the provincial government every year from 2016 until 2019. Upon the first payment by the city government, the convention center will be transferred to the city government.

Facilities
The convention centre features an International Media Center, a large Plenary Hall, an Exhibition Hall and several Meeting Rooms.

Photos

References

External links
Official Website of the 12th ASEAN Summit
Cebu Turns Over CICC to NOC 
12th ASEAN Summit
Manila Bulletin - Groundbreaking today for convention center
CICC facing delay

Buildings and structures in Mandaue
Landmarks in the Philippines
Convention centers in the Philippines